Area codes 715 and 534 are telephone area codes in the North American Numbering Plan (NANP) for the U.S. state of Wisconsin. The numbering plan area (NPA) comprises most of the northern part of the state. 715 was one of the original North American area codes created in 1947, while 534 was added in 2010 as an additional code for the same numbering plan area to form an overlay plan.

History
When the first nationwide telephone numbering plan was created in 1947, Wisconsin was divided into two NPAs. The northern part received area code 715, while the rest was assigned area code 414. Due to northern Wisconsin's low population density, 715 was for a long time one of the few original area codes never to have been split or overlaid. But by 2010, the proliferation of cellphones and pagers had almost exhausted 715's telephone numbers. Central office code relief was implemented by adding area code 534 to form an overlay that summer.

Service area

Counties
Ashland, Barron, Bayfield, Buffalo, Burnett, Chippewa, Clark, Douglas, Dunn, Eau Claire, Florence, Forest, Iron, Jackson, Langlade, Lincoln, Marathon, Marinette, Menominee, Oconto, Oneida, Outagamie, Pepin, Pierce, Polk, Portage, Price, Rusk, Saint Croix, Sawyer, Shawano, Taylor, Trempealeau, Vilas, Washburn, Waupaca, Waushara, and Wood

Cities, towns and villages
 Abbotsford,  Alma Center,  Almena,  Almond,  Altoona,  Amberg,  Amery,  Amherst,  Amherst Junction,  Aniwa,  Antigo,  Arbor Vitae, Argonne,  Arkansaw,  Armstrong Creek,  Arpin,  Ashland,  Athelstane,  Athens,  Auburndale,  Augusta,  Babcock,  Baldwin,  Balsam Lake,  Bancroft,  Barron,  Barronett,  Bay City,  Bayfield,  Bear Creek, Beecher, Beldenville,  Benoit,  Big Falls,  Birchwood,  Birnamwood,  Black River Falls,  Blenker,  Bloomer,  Bonduel,  Boulder Junction,  Bowler,  Boyceville,  Boyd,  Brantwood,  Brill,  Brokaw,  Bruce,  Brule,  Bryant,  Butternut,  Cable,  Cadott,  Cameron Caroline,  Catawba,  Cecil,  Centuria,  Chetek,  Chili,  Chippewa Falls,  Clam Lake,  Clayton,  Clear Lake,  Cleghorn, Clintonville,  Colby,  Colfax,  Coloma,  Comstock,  Conover,  Conrath,  Cornell,  Cornucopia,  Couderay,  Crandon,  Crivitz,  Cumberland,  Curtiss,  Cushing,  Custer,  Dallas,  Danbury,  Deer Park,  Deerbrook,  Dorchester,  Downing,  Downsville,  Dresser,  Drummond,  Dunbar,  Durand,  Eagle River,  East Ellsworth,  Eau Claire,  Eau Galle,  Edgar,  Edgewater,  Eland,  Elcho,  Elderon,  Eleva,  Elk Mound,  Ellsworth,  Elmwood,  Elton,  Embarrass,  Exeland,  Fairchild,  Fall Creek,  Fence,  Fifield,  Florence,  Foxboro,  Frederic,  Galloway,  Gile,  Gilman,  Gilmanton,  Gleason,  Glen Flora,  Glenwood City,  Glidden,  Goodman,  Gordon,  Grand View,  Granton,  Grantsburg,  Green Valley,  Greenwood,  Gresham,  Hager City,  Hammond,  Hancock,  Hannibal,  Harshaw,  Hatley,  Haugen,  Hawkins,  Hawthorne,  Hayward,  Hazelhurst,  Heafford Junction,  Herbster,  Hertel,  Hewitt,  High Bridge,  Hixton,  Holcombe,  Houlton,  Hudson,  Humbird,  Hurley,  Independence,  Iola,  Irma,  Iron Belt,  Iron River,  Jim Falls,  Jump River (CDP),  Town of Jump River,  Junction City,  Kennan,  Keshena,  King,  Knapp,  Kronenwetter,  La Pointe,  Lac du Flambeau,  Ladysmith,  Lake Nebagamon,  Lake Tomahawk,  Lakewood,  Land O' Lakes,  Laona,  Leopolis,  Long Lake,  Loyal,  Lublin,  Luck,  Maiden Rock,  Manitowish Waters,  Maple,  Marathon,  Marengo,  Marinette,  Marion,  Marshfield,  Mason,  Mattoon,  McNaughton,  Medford,  Mellen,  Menomonie,  Mercer,  Merrill,  Merrillan,  Mikana,  Milladore,  Millston,  Milltown,  Minocqua,  Minong,  Mondovi,  Montreal,  Mosinee,  Mountain,  Neillsville,  Nekoosa,  Nelson,  Nelsonville,  Neopit,  New Auburn,  New Richmond,  Niagara,  Odanah,  Ogema,  Ojibwa,  Osceola,  Osseo,  Owen,  Park Falls,  Pearson,  Pelican Lake,  Pembine,  Pepin,  Peshtigo,  Phelps,  Phillips,  Phlox,  Pickerel,  Pigeon Falls,  Pittsville,  Plainfield,  Plover,  Plum City,  Poplar,  Port Edwards,  Port Wing,  Porterfield,  Prairie Farm,  Prentice,  Prescott,  Presque Isle,  Radisson,  Rhinelander,  Rib Lake,  Rice Lake,  Ridgeland,  Ringle,  River Falls,  Roberts,  Rock Falls,  Rosholt,  Rothschild,  Rudolph,  Saint Croix Falls,  St. Germain,  Sand Creek,  Sarona,  Saxon,  Sayner,  Scandinavia,  Schofield,  Shawano,  Sheldon,  Shell Lake,  Siren,  Solon Springs,  Somerset,  South Range,  Spencer,  Spooner,  Spring Valley,  Springbrook,  Stanley,  Star Lake,  Star Prairie,  Stetsonville,  Stevens Point,  Stockholm,  Stone Lake,  Stratford,  Strum,  Summit Lake,  Superior,  Taylor,  Thorp,  Three Lakes,  Tigerton,  Tilleda,  Tomahawk,  Tony,  Townsend,  Trego,  Tripoli,  Turtle Lake,  Unity,  Upson,  Vesper,  Wabeno,  Wascott,  Washburn,  Waupaca,  Wausau,  Wausaukee, Webb Lake,  Webster,  Westboro,  Weyerhaeuser,  Wheeler,  White Lake,  Whitehall,  Willard,  Wilson,  Winter,  Wisconsin Rapids,  Withee,  Wittenberg,  Woodruff,  Woodville, and Zachow

See also
List of NANP area codes

References

External links

 List of exchanges from AreaCodeDownload.com, 715 Area Code

715
715
Telecommunications-related introductions in 1947
Telecommunications-related introductions in 2010